William Wilkinson (1819–1901) was a British Gothic Revival architect who practised in Oxford, England.

Family

Wilkinson's father was a builder in Witney in Oxfordshire. William's elder brother George Wilkinson (1814–1890) was also an architect, as were William's nephews C.C. Rolfe (died 1907) and H.W. Moore (1850–1915).

Career
Most of Wilkinson's buildings are in Oxfordshire. His major works include the Randolph Hotel in Oxford, completed in 1864. He was in partnership with his nephew H.W. Moore from 1881. In his long career Wilkinson had a number of pupils, including H.J. Tollit (1835–1904).

Works

Churches
In 1841, at the age of only 22, Wilkinson designed a new Church of England parish church, Holy Trinity at Lew, Oxfordshire. His other work on churches included:

St Leonard's parish church, Eynsham: restoration, 1856
Witney Cemetery: lodge and two chapels, 1857
Witney Workhouse: chapel, 1860
All Saints' parish church, Middleton Cheney, Northamptonshire: Horton family mausoleum, 1866–67
St Andrew's parish church, Headington, Oxford: added north aisle, 1880

Police buildings

Wilkinson moved to Oxford in 1856 and succeeded J.C. Buckler as architect to the local police committee. Oxfordshire County Constabulary was formed in 1857, and Wilkinson designed several buildings for the new force.

Watlington police station, 1858–59
 Witney police station, 1860
Woodstock police station, 1863
Chipping Norton police station, 1864–65
Burford police station, 1869
Magistrates' room at Deddington Court House, 1874

Houses
Wilkinson designed Home Farm on the Shirburn Castle estate, built in 1856–57. From 1860 he laid out the Norham Manor estate in north Oxford. The estate was slowly developed with large villas, a number of which Wilkinson designed himself. Wilkinson also designed town houses and small country houses elsewhere in Oxfordshire:

Hollybank, Wootton, 1862–63
10, Broad Street, Oxford, 1863
Whittlebury, Northamptonshire: farmhouse, 1864
The Holt, Middleton Cheney, Northamptonshire, 1864
60 Banbury Road, Oxford, 1865–66
Bignell House, Chesterton, 1866 (partly demolished)
23 and 24 Cornhill, Banbury, 1866
Astrop Park, Northamptonshire: lodge, pheasantry and cottage, 1868
Witney Almshouses: restoration, 1868.
Brashfield House, Caversfield, 1871–73
Shelswell Park, Shelswell, 1875
Cowley Place (now St Hilda's College, Oxford): extension, 1877–78

Clergy houses
A number of the houses that Wilkinson designed were for clergy. Most were for the Church of England, but he also designed a presbytery that was built for the Roman Catholic Church.

Ramsden parsonage, 1862
Chadlington parsonage, 1863 (now Chadlington House)
Duns Tew rectory, 1864 (now Priory Court)
Godington parsonage, 1867 (now the Old Vicarage)
Upper Heyford parsonage, 1869
Rousham rectory: enlargement and remodelling, 1873.
St Aloysius' presbytery, Woodstock Road, Oxford, 1877–78
Combe vicarage and Institute (with H.W. Moore), 1892–93

Educational establishments
Wilkinson designed the library for the Oxford Union, built in 1863. He designed a number of schools, of which the largest was St Edward's School, Oxford, whose buildings he completed in phases from 1873 until 1886. His other schools include:
Hailey School, 1848
Minster Lovell School, 1870–72
Burford Elementary School, 1875–77
Thame Grammar School, 1877–79
Salesian College, Crescent Road, Cowley, 1880

Industrial buildings
Late in his career Wilkinson undertook one industrial commission: a new smith shop and foundry for William Lucy's Eagle Ironworks in Jericho, Oxford. This single-storey building was completed in 1879. It was demolished after Lucy ceased production in England in 2005.

Publications

See also
 List of Oxford architects

References

Sources

1819 births
1901 deaths
19th-century English architects
Architects from Oxfordshire
English ecclesiastical architects
Gothic Revival architects